Sammy Keyes is a series of mystery novels written by Wendelin Van Draanen for children aged 10–16. The series focuses on Sammy's adventures as an amateur sleuth. The books, which are narrated in the first-person perspective by Sammy, involve detective fiction as well as comedy. Sammy begins her adventures in the first book as a seventh-grader, and the series ends when she completes the eighth grade. The series ran for eighteen books.

Setting
The Sammy Keyes novels are based in the fictional town of Santa Martina, which is located in California. Santa Martina is closely based on the real city of Santa Maria, California, down to names of streets used throughout the series, and well known landmarks. Other fictional cities frequently mentioned are Santa Luisa (San Luis Obispo), and Sisquane (Sisquoc). The city of Pomloc is also mentioned once, a reference to the city of Lompoc. All of these places are located near to the real city of Santa Maria. Sammy is an unofficial teenage detective who solves mysteries while also dealing with her personal friend life, family life, and relationship life.

Main characters
 Samantha Josephine "Sammy" Keyes is a girl who is illegally sent to live with her grandmother while her mother decides to achieve her dreams as an actress in Hollywood. Spunky, sarcastic, and very curious, she solves mysteries surrounding her town and other areas she visits. Frequently she is tormented both by other kids in school and on the street by people she meets, and whose emotions are constantly tested. She, along with her friends Holly, Marissa, and Dot, plays on the school softball team as the catcher, using a softball mitt that belonged to her dad. The series starts in Sammy Keyes and the Hotel Thief, at the beginning of Sammy's first year in William Rose Junior High as a seventh-grader. By Sammy Keyes and the Power of Justice Jack, she is now halfway through her last year of junior high. She has a strong dislike for her mother for many reasons. When her "fourteenth" birthday came around, she was told it was only her thirteenth, as her mother had entered her in kindergarten when she was four, falsely assuming she was ready and forging her birth certificate to say she was five. When told Sammy would be held back, Lana refused to admit Sammy's real age to her, out of fear she'd spill the beans. All in all, Sammy is a fun, wacky and a "not so typical" 13-year-old girl.
 Rita Keyes "Grams" , is Sammy's grandmother and guardian who loves Sammy very much. She never ceases to worry about Sammy when Sammy gets involved in her adventures. However, the two of them are very close, much closer than Sammy is to her mother. No children are allowed to live in the Senior Highrise, so Sammy is frequently forced to lie about her home address and living situation. The two also have to constantly avoid their nosy neighbors (Mrs. Graybill and later in the series Mrs. Wedgewood) to keep the small family from being evicted.
 Lana Keyes "Lady Lana" is Sammy's irresponsible and careless mother. She constantly keeps secrets from her only daughter, and leaves Sammy with Grams while she becomes an actress in Hollywood. She finally reveals Sammy's father's identity in Sammy Keyes and the Showdown in Sin City. She has also kept her Sammy's true age away from Sammy and changed her own identity and age to seem younger. Sammy is not happy with her mother's decision to abandon her, and holds a grudge against her for this. She stars on a soap opera as Jewel, an "amnesiac and good friend" throughout the series. She is known as the Gas Away Lady and Lady Lana, or when Sammy is on good terms with her (which is not often), Mom. As of Sammy Keyes and the Power of Justice Jack, Lana is now dating Casey's father and out of a job because her soap opera has been canceled.
 Marissa McKenze, Sammy's best friend, is extremely rich and has more independence than Sammy because of her workaholic parents. She has a younger brother named Mikey, and he has an addiction for both junk food and goldfish. After Sammy Keyes and the Cold Hard Cash, Mikey's love for junk food goes down and he slowly starts losing weight. When Marissa is nervous, she will do the "McKenze Dance", which involves biting of her fingernails and bobbing up and down on her toes. Marissa also has a crush on Danny Urbanski, an eighth-grader. Marissa downplays her wealth heavily, sometimes criticizing her parents for working too hard and not paying enough attention to their children. Later in the series, Marissa and her family start having serious financial issues, which causes Marissa to become closer to her brother.
 Brandon McKenze is Marissa's cousin and Sammy's good friend. Although he is in high school, Sammy seemed to have feelings for him in the earlier books, but slowly began to become comfortable around him after developing stronger feelings for Casey. Brandon is on the swim team and often invites Marissa and Sammy to his meets. He works at a smoothie place in the mall. He, similar to Marissa, comes from a rich family, as his father is a popular doctor in town.
 Margaret "Dot" DeVries was introduced in the second book, Sammy Keyes and the Skeleton Man. Her nickname is derived from a beauty mark she has on her cheek; her father also has one. Dot first lived in a "skinny" two-story house that could barely fit her large family; by the fifth book, Sammy Keyes and the Curse of Moustache Mary, she has moved to a larger house in Sisquane. Her grandparents live in Holland and her mother often says "ja" instead of "yeah". In Sammy Keyes and the Skeleton Man, Sammy sneaks into Heather's Halloween party by posing as Dot's cousin, and added a fake beauty mark to make it more "convincing".
 Holly Janquell was introduced in the third book, Sammy Keyes and the Sisters of Mercy. During Sammy's volunteer time (to work off her detentions for misusing the school's public address system), she spots a girl who bears an uncanny resemblance to herself. Her curiosity aroused, Sammy tries to find out as much as she can about this girl. Eventually, Sammy finds that Holly is a homeless, orphaned girl who ran away from her foster home due to mistreatment, who had been living in a refrigerator box by a dried-up riverbank. Sammy finds a home for Holly at the Pup Parlor, a dog-grooming salon run by the mother-and-daughter duo Vera and Meg Talbrook. In return for the Talbrooks' kindness, Holly works after school in the Pup Parlor. In the beginning, Holly has a penchant for rummaging through garbage; however, later in the series she seems to have shaken off the habit. In 2006, Van Draanen later released a book called Runaway, a series of journal entries written by Holly that tells about her life on the run.
 Heather Acosta is Sammy's archenemy. Their mutual dislike for each other originates at their first meeting: Heather tries to take advantage of Marissa's wealth by asking her to lend her some money, and then jabs Sammy in the behind with a pin. Enraged, Sammy punches Heather on the nose, and Heather pretends that her nose is broken. As punishment, Sammy is suspended from school for a day. Later, however, Sammy is able to uncover Heather's bid for sympathy (including a spurious charity called the "Help Heal Heather Fund") and Heather is punished. Heather has two friends who are extremely stupid and seem to exist to do her bidding. Heather and her friends have been known to smoke cigarettes and drink beer. She has a brother called Casey, and their parents are divorced; Heather lives with their mother in town, and Casey with their father in the urban area of Sisquane. In Sammy Keyes and the Psycho Kitty Queen, she is found to have the same birthday as Sammy, much to their horror. Throughout the books she has tried to ruin Sammy's reputation, as well as physically attacking her at least once. However, later Sammy and Heather seem to have become friends, as in Sammy Keyes and the Showdown in Sin City, after helping each other find their parents (Lana and Warren).
 Casey Acosta Heather's brother Casey was introduced to the series in the fifth book Sammy Keyes and the Curse of Moustache Mary, and seems to be the complete opposite of his sister. He has a dislike for Heather, such as when Hudson asked if he was Heather's brother. He replied, "A fact I've been known to deny." He is good friends with Sammy and often sticks up for her. Sammy is often unsure of her relationship with Casey, who took a liking to her before she even knew him. The two went to a school dance together in Sammy Keyes and the Dead Giveaway. In Sammy Keyes and the Wild Things, Sammy began to have feelings for him and they grow closer. Casey shows strong feelings for Sammy throughout the series. Sammy's friends often tease her about her relationship with Casey. In "Sammy Keyes and the Wedding Crasher", Sammy believed that their relationship would be over because she received a harsh text telling her to back off, but she later found out that it was Heather that sent the text. At the end of the book, the two kiss. in "Sammy Keyes and the Night of Skulls" the two are an official couple, and they frequently hang out. During the book, Casey's mother forbids him to keep seeing Sammy and takes away his phone, so Casey and Sammy have to meet up in their secret "place", the graveyard, together at secret times to keep going out. In 'Sammy Keyes and the Showdown in Sin City', Casey and Sammy believe that their parents are getting married, but later in the book find out that it's not true and end up getting off Casey's mother "forbidden hold".
Warren Acosta is the father of Heather and Casey. He lives in a house alone with Casey in Sisquane and seems to sound exactly like his son over the phone. He has also shown feelings toward Sammy's mother, a situation that disturbs both Sammy and Casey. Warren has a distant relationship towards Heather and has joked that "sometimes he wishes that he had a restraining order on Heather, too". In 'Sammy Keyes and the Showdown in Sin City', the book portrays that Warren was going to marry Sammy's mother, but is turned down when Sammy's mother catches deep hidden feelings for her past boyfriend.
Candi Acosta is divorced from Warren Acosta, and is the mother of Heather and Casey. She often acts like her daughter portraying characteristics that are vicious and not polite. Candi also hates Sammy and probably her mother. Candi is known for her weird way of dressing up. She thinks she's a young woman, and she is a little nuts in the mind. Candi lives in town in Santa Martina, with Heather, and Casey often visits (by his father's orders.) In 'Sammy Keyes and the Showdown in Sin City', it is proven that Candi still has hidden feelings for her ex-husband, Warren.
 Officer Gil Borsch, the figure of the law in the series, is constantly pursuing Sammy for jaywalking and thinks that she is a criminal. However, when Sammy helps him out in a case during Sammy Keyes and the Runaway Elf, he changes his mind about her and they become friends over time.  In Sammy Keyes and the Cold Hard Cash, he becomes engaged "for the third time" and even asks Sammy to be in his wedding. In the later books, he is promoted and Sammy doesn't see him as often.
 Hudson Graham is 73 years old, and is always wearing a fancy pair of boots, usually made out of reptile hide. Sammy often visits Hudson and sits on his porch to sort things out in her head. Hudson offers Sammy advice, usually focused around dealing with her archenemy, Heather, or the mystery currently playing out in that particular book. Hudson has a dachshund called Rommel, accused in Sammy Keyes and the Psycho Kitty Queen of mauling cats, and who unfortunately passes at the age of 13 in Sammy Keyes and the Cold Hard Cash.Hudson's advice usually plays a pivotal point in Sammy's unraveling of the story's mystery. In later books, Hudson and Grams develop a mutual crush on each other and end up getting married.
 Billy Pratt, an obnoxious, albeit lovable classmate of Sammy's. Billy is one of the popular kids in their grade and was elected "School Clown." Billy was held back; he is supposed to be an 8th grader. This perhaps contributes to his depiction in the series as the school clown. Billy has kissed Sammy on a dare by Heather in an attempt to ruin her relationship with Casey, but Billy makes it up to her by kissing Heather (the cod fish) during the school play. In Sammy Keyes and the Night of Skulls he gets together with Marissa, but later she breaks up with him. He is the school clown and can make anyone smile. He is also a very good friend with Casey and is used to communicate with Sammy. His real name is not Billy but William; however, everyone knows him by the name of Billy.

Sammy secretly lives with her grandmother in a "seniors-only" apartment complex. She's not allowed to make much noise, so she passes the time spying on her neighbors with binoculars. One morning she is looking into the windows of the hotel across the street, when she spots a thief burgling one of the rooms. Instead of calling the police, Sammy watches until the thief catches her staring. They both stare at each other until Sammy breaks the spell by waving at him.

Sammy Keyes also has many problems. On Sammy's first day of school she gets confused about where to go so she asks a girl named Heather Acosta. When Heather replied she yelled at her and walked away like was a princess. At lunch Heather sits with Sammy and her friend Marissa and Heather asks Marissa for money and Sammy said no for Marissa and Heather stuck pin in Sammy's butt and walked away. Once Sammy got the pin out of her but she walked over to heather and punched her nose, and it started to gush blood.  Sammy was suspended for doing that.

While Sammy was walking home from school, she saw police cars and a bunch of people surrounding the hotel. Sammy was curious about what was going on. She decided to go in and she saw two police men asking a lady about a robbery when Sammy realized that the hotel room she saw was that lady's hotel room. Sammy noticed that one of the cops had given her a ticket for jaywalking before. Sammy started to talk to the officers about what she saw but they did not believe her. The lady who got robbed did. The lady that got robbed was named Gina. Gina explained that four thousand dollars were stolen.

Later, a threatening note is slipped under their neighbor's door. Their neighbor Mrs. Graybill, thinks that Sammy wrote the note.  Mrs. Graybill threatens to call the police and that is what she did. The officers that arrived at the door were the same ones that were at the hotel last night. Even though Sammy says that she said that she did not write the note, no one believed her.

Awards

Sammy Keyes and the Hotel Thief won the 1999 Edgar Award for Best Children's Mystery. The series has been nominated for the award five times. The nominated books are Sammy Keyes and the Curse of Moustache Mary, Sammy Keyes and the Search for Snake-Eyes, Sammy Keyes and the Art of Deception and Sammy Keyes and the Wild Things.

References

External links
 Wendelin Van Draanen's official home page

Keyes, Sammy
Series of children's books
Novels by Wendelin Van Draanen
Children's mystery novels
American children's novels